A drugstore is an American term for a shop featuring a pharmacy. It may also refer to:

 Drugstore (band), a British-based pop rock trio
Drugstore (album), the 1995 debut album recorded by the band Drugstore
"Drugstore", a 1998 song by Stabbing Westward from Darkest Days
drugstore.com, a United States-based website in operation from 1999 to 2006
Drugstore beetle, an insect with a reputation for eating pharmacy products